This is a list of the squads picked for the men's 2009 ICC Champions Trophy. This was the sixth edition of the ICC Champions Trophy tournament and took place in South Africa between 24 September and 5 October.

Australia
Australia named their 15-man squad on 22 August 2009. Brad Haddin withdrew from the squad on 3 September 2009 following finger surgery; he was replaced by Tim Paine.
Coach: Tim Nielsen

England
England named their 15-man squad on 17 August 2009. Andrew Flintoff was named in the original squad but withdrew on 23 August in order to undergo exploratory surgery on his knee.

Coach: Andy Flower

India
India named their 15-man squad on 16 August 2009.
Yuvraj Singh was replaced by Virat Kohli after he fractured his little finger.

Coach: Gary Kirsten

New Zealand
New Zealand named their 15-man squad on 23 August 2009. Jesse Ryder cramped in a match. Daryl Tuffey and Jacob Oram were also injured. Thus New Zealand team lost three of their mainstream players. Scott Styris was also called from New Zealand for replacements in the final or semi-final of 2009 ICC Champions Trophy.

Coach: Andy Moles

Pakistan
Pakistan named their 15-man squad on 21 August 2009. Mohammad Asif got selected after his ban after a year and a half. Also the three players from ICL Imran Nazir, Mohammad Yousuf and Naved-ul-Hasan made their way into the squad after issuing the photocopies of NOC to the PCB. Shahid Afridi acted as captain in their first match.

Coach: Intikhab Alam

South Africa
South Africa named their 15-man squad on 20 August 2009.

Coach: Mickey Arthur

Sri Lanka
Sri Lanka named their 15-man squad on 25 August 2009.

Coach:

West Indies
West Indies named their 15-man squad on 17 August 2009. Despite some negotiations with the West Indian players the Board named their A-team players for the tournament.

Coach:

References

2009
Squads